Loraine Lambert (born 18 August 1972) is a retired Australian professional golfer who played on the Ladies European Tour and the LPGA Tour. She won the Air France Madame Open in 1997.

Career
Lambert was a top amateur in Queensland, competing alongside Karrie Webb and Rachel Hetherington. She won successive New Zealand Ladies Amateur titles in 1991 and 1992. When attempting to win for the third successive year, she was beaten in the final by home player Lynn Brooky.

She represented Australia at the 1992 Espirito Santo Trophy together with Ericka Jayatilaka and Joanne Mills, finishing 7th.

Professional career
Lambert turned professional in 1994 and joined the LET mid-way through the season. Her first event was the Evian Masters, where she finished T10. She was runner-up at the 1996 WPGA Championship of Europe at Gleneagles in Scotland, one stroke behind Tina Fischer. In 1997, she won her maiden international title, the Air France Madame Open, two strokes ahead of Alison Nicholas of England.

On the 1998 Ladies Asian Golf Tour, she finished third at the Toyota Philippines Ladies Open and was runner-up at the Malaysia JAL Ladies Open, one stroke behind Sandrine Mendiburu, and at the Indonesia Ladies Open, behind Tina Fischer.

Lambert first joined the LPGA Tour with conditional status in 1999 but had limited success. In 2002, she played mainly on the Futures Tour, with a best finish of T5 at the Greater Lima Futures Open. She earned fully exempt status by finishing 17th at the LPGA Final Qualifying Tournament in late 2002, and played full time on the LPGA Tour in 2003 and 2004. Her best finish in 2003 was T12 at the Giant Eagle LPGA Classic, and in 2004 she made the cut at the U.S. Women's Open.

She retired from international touring after the 2004 season, playing local ALPG Tour events until 2009. She collected a total of seven titles on the ALPG Tour between 1994 and 2005.

Amateur wins
1991 New Zealand Ladies Amateur 
1992 New Zealand Ladies Amateur, Australian Girls' Amateur

Source:

Professional wins (8)

Ladies European Tour (1)

ALPG Tour (7)
1994 (2) Bruce Lynton Bmw Pro-Am, Nudgee Golf Club Pro-Am
1988 (1) Betta Electrical Bega Ladies Classic
2000 (1) Bermagui Country Club Ladies Pro-Am
2003 (1) Aristocrat Sapphire Coast Ladies Golf Classic
2005 (2) Jack Newton Celebrity Classic, Moss Vale Golf Club Pro-Am

Source:

Team appearances
Amateur
Espirito Santo Trophy (representing Australia): 1992
Tasman Cup (representing Australia): 1993 (winners)
Queen Sirikit Cup (representing Australia): 1992

References

Australian female golfers
Ladies European Tour golfers
LPGA Tour golfers
ALPG Tour golfers
1972 births
Living people